Marcus Mathisen (born 27 February 1996) is a Danish professional footballer playing as midfielder for Allsvenskan club IK Sirius.

Club career

FC Copenhagen
In the spring 2015, Mathisen trained with the F.C. Copenhagen first team and played several matches for the reserve team. He was in the squad for the 2015 Danish Cup Final, but remained on the bench for the whole match. Three days later, Mathisen made his first team debut, when he replaced Daniel Amartey in a 2–0 loss against FC Midtjylland.

Mathisen was permanently promoted to the first team squad on July 13, 2015.

Halmstads BK

On 20 November 2016 Marcus Mathisen scored two goals in the last play-off leg against Helsingborg at Olympia, which meant 3–2 on aggregate and advancement to 2017 Allsvenskan.

Falkenbergs FF
It was confirmed on 10 December 2018, that Mathisen had signed with Falkenbergs FF until 2020.

IK Sirius 
On 4 of january 2021 Mathisen got signed by IK Sirius as a free-agent, he signed a contract until 2023.

Honours

Club
Copenhagen
 Danish Superliga: 2015–16
 Danish Cup: 2014–15, 2015–16

References

External links
 
 Marcus Mathisen DBU 
 Marcus Mathisen at Football-Lineups
 Marcus Mathisen at Falkenbergs FF

1996 births
Living people
Danish men's footballers
Denmark youth international footballers
Danish Superliga players
F.C. Copenhagen players
Allsvenskan players
Superettan players
Halmstads BK players
Falkenbergs FF players
Association football defenders
People from Albertslund Municipality
Sportspeople from the Capital Region of Denmark